Skull Valley is a small, unincorporated town in Yavapai County, Arizona, United States.  It is located seventeen miles west of Prescott.  The community has a post office. As of the 2020 census, the population in the Skull Valley Elementary School District was greater than 800 people.

History

Skull Valley was so named when settlers found human remains resulting from a previous battle between Native Americans.

Skull Valley's population was 21 in 1920, and was 100 in the 1960 Census.

Skull Valley was home to George Phippen (1915–1966), a well known western artist, co-founder and first president of the Cowboy Artists of America.

The area's history is preserved by the Skull Valley Historical Society, which operates a free museum. Robert L. Pearson, a native of the area and retired wildlife manager, created an online photo gallery of the area's insects. In mid-2019, Skull Valley was featured on S.B. Schreffler's Revisiting History in which Robert L. Pearson appeared as a guest on the Revisiting People series.

Two cemeteries remain from years ago: the Old Skull Valley Cemetery and a newer Christopherson Cemetery.

References

External links
 Skull Valley Historical Society
 Bug Guide
 Skull Valley Bible Church

Unincorporated communities in Yavapai County, Arizona
Unincorporated communities in Arizona